Jenison is a census-designated place (CDP) in Ottawa County in the U.S. state of Michigan. The community is located within Georgetown Charter Township. The population of the CDP was 17,211 as of the 2000 census. The current estimated population for the entire Jenison ZIP code, 49428, is 25,770. The geographical boundaries of the ZIP code are larger than that of the CDP.

It is a bedroom community in proximity to Grand Rapids.

History
The area that Jenison occupies was first inhabited by Peoria and Odawa indigenous peoples, and later populated by white settlers in 1836 as a lumber site along the Grand River.
Jenison gained its name from the Jenison family's sawmill, which opened in 1864. A post office called Jenisonville was established in 1872, and the name was changed to Jenison in 1887.

Geography

Demographics

As of the census of 2000, there were 17,211 people, 5,975 households, and 4,863 families residing in the community. The racial makeup of the community was 98.84% White, 0.49% African American, 0.21% Native American, 0.85% Asian, 0.01% Pacific Islander, 0.53% from other races, and 0.87% from two or more races. Hispanic or Latino of any race were 1.77% of the population.

There were 5,975 households, out of which 39.8% had children under the age of 18 living with them, 73.5% were married couples living together, 5.8% had a female householder with no husband present, and 18.6% were non-families. 16.9% of all households were made up of individuals, and 10.1% had someone living alone who was 65 years of age or older.  The average household size was 2.86 and the average family size was 3.24.

In the community, the population was spread out, with 28.9% under the age of 18, 7.8% from 18 to 24, 26.8% from 25 to 44, 24.0% from 45 to 64, and 12.5% who were 65 years of age or older.  The median age was 36 years. For every 100 females, there were 93.5 males.  For every 100 females age 18 and over, there were 90.5 males.

The median income for a household in the community was $56,426, and the median income for a family was $61,957. Males had a median income of $46,738 versus $28,204 for females. The per capita income for the community was $21,021.  About 1.8% of families and 2.5% of the population were below the poverty line, including 3.1% of those under age 18 and 4.3% of those age 65 or over.

Major highways

Major roads

 Baldwin Street
 Bauer Road
 Cottonwood Drive
 Chicago Drive

Schools
The majority of the community is in Jenison Public Schools. A small portion is in the Hudsonville Public School District.

Jenison Public Schools facilities include:
 Jenison High School
 Jenison Junior High School
 Bursley Elementary School
 Bauerwood Elementary School
 Pinewood Elementary School
 Sandy Hill Elementary School
 Rosewood Elementary School
 ECC, Early Childhood Center - Michigan State University Partnership(former Maplewood Elementary School)
Jenison International Academy - Online School
Private:
 Jenison Christian School

Notable people
 Caleb Baragar, professional baseball player for the San Francisco Giants of Major League Baseball
 David Brandt, retired player in the National Football League
 Mark Dewey, retired Major League Baseball pitcher
 Kevin DeYoung, pastor, author
 Paul Grasmanis, retired player in the National Football League
 Richard Grenell, diplomat and ambassador 
 Benny McCoy, retired Major League Baseball infielder
Andy Ponstein, ARCA driver
Glenn Duffie Shriver, convicted of attempted espionage.

References

External links

Georgetown Charter Township
 Grandville-Jenison Chamber of Commerce
Jenison Public Schools
Jenison Christian School
Georgetown Little League
Georgetown Township Library

Unincorporated communities in Ottawa County, Michigan
Census-designated places in Michigan
Unincorporated communities in Michigan
Census-designated places in Ottawa County, Michigan